Dietrich Wilhelm Heinrich Busch (16 March 1788 – 15 March 1858) was a German obstetrician born in Marburg.

In 1806 he earned his medical doctorate at the University of Marburg, becoming an associate professor of surgery in 1814. In 1817 he was appointed professor of obstetrics at Marburg, where from 1820 to 1829 he was director of the department of obstetrics. In 1829 he succeeded Adam Elias von Siebold (1775-1828) as professor and director of the obstetrics clinic at Friedrich Wilhelm University in Berlin, serving as university rector in 1835/36. He would remain as director of the obstetrical clinic in Berlin until his death.

Among his better known students in Berlin were Carl Siegmund Franz Credé (1819-1892), Karl von Hecker (1827-1882) and Bernhard Sigmund Schultze (1827-1919). Following his death, he was succeeded in Berlin by Eduard Arnold Martin (1809-1875).

During his career he was an editor of the following journals; Gemeinsame Zeitschrift für Geburtskunde (1825–34), Neue Zeitschrift für Geburtskunde (1834-53) and Monatsschrift für Geburtskunde (1853–58).

Selected publications 
 Lehrbuch der Geburtskunde (1829); several editions - Textbook of obstetrics.
 Die theoretische und practische geburtskunde durch abbildungen erläutert, (1838) - Theoretical and practical obstetrics explained through pictures.
 Das Geschlechtsleben des Weibes in physiologischer, pathologischer und therapeutischer Hinsicht, five volumes (1839–44) - Female sexuality based on physiological, pathological and therapeutic aspects.
 Atlas geburtshülflicher Abbildungen, mit Bezugnahme auf das Lehrbuch der Geburtskunde, (1841)
 Handbuch der Geburtskunde in alphabetischer Ordnung, four volumes w/A. Moser (1840–43) - Handbook of obstetrics, alphabetically.

References 
  translated biography @ Allgemeine Deutsche Biographie
 Katalog der wissenschaftlichen Sammlungen der Humboldt-Universität zu Berlin (Biography in German)
 A portion of the biographical information is based on an equivalent article at the German Wikipedia.

German obstetricians
People from Marburg
Academic staff of the University of Marburg
Academic staff of the Humboldt University of Berlin
Presidents of the Humboldt University of Berlin
1788 births
1858 deaths